Paralympic swimming at the 2019 Parapan American Games in Lima, Peru was held at the Villa Deportiva Nacional Videna Aquatic Centre.

Medal table

Medalists

Men's events

Women's events

Mixed

See also
Swimming at the 2019 Pan American Games

References

2019 Parapan American Games
Parapan American Games
Parapan American Games
Parapan American Games